David Brown (June 9, 1895 – disappeared April 27, 1925) was a left-handed pitcher in Negro league baseball. Considered one of the better pitchers in Negro league history, he was also known for serious off-the-field problems. His career came to a premature end when he became a fugitive after allegedly killing a man in 1925.

Early career
Brown was born in Leon County, Texas.  He had a good curveball and excellent control. He was also a good fielder and had outstanding speed, but was a weak hitter. Brown played with the Dallas Black Giants in 1917 and 1918. He was regarded as a "timid nice guy" who did not cause trouble, but during his time with the Dallas Black Giants he was involved in a highway robbery. Although Brown was reported to have become a fugitive, Rube Foster agreed to pay $20,000 for Brown's parole and he became a member of Foster's Chicago American Giants.

Chicago American Giants Seasons

Brown became the ace of the American Giants as they dominated negro league baseball in the early 1920s. From 1920 through 1922, he posted a 29-8 record in league games. His 11–3 record led them to a pennant win in 1921 including three victories in a playoff with the Bacharach Giants. His 8–3 record contributed to another pennant in 1922. In the winter following the 1922 season, Brown joined Oscar Charleston for the first season of the Cuban League's Santa Clara Leopardos.

League change and abrupt career end
For the 1923 season, Brown left Rube Foster's American Giants for the brand new Eastern Colored League. Foster voiced his displeasure, pointing out that Brown had been paroled to him and that he had promised Brown's mother to take care of him. He pointed out that the public would vilify him if he revoked. Brown posted a losing record in his first season with the New York Lincoln Giants but he and Charleston returned to Cuba the following winter and helped Santa Clara compile one of the best records in Cuban baseball history. His second season with the Lincoln Giants improved on the first and he defeated "Cannonball" Dick Redding and the Brooklyn Royal Giants to win the New York City championship.

Brown's career came to an abrupt end in 1925. He went to a bar on the night of April 27, 1925 with Frank Wickware and Oliver Marcelle. Marcelle was a third baseman with a reputation for trouble off the field. A fight erupted at the bar, possibly involving cocaine, and Brown killed one of the participants, Benjamin Adair. Wickware and Marcelle were questioned the next day at the ballpark, but Brown had disappeared.

Rumors and legacy
The FBI searched for Brown, but he was never officially seen again. Rumors abounded that he continued playing baseball under the alias "Lefty Wilson" with semi-professional teams through the Midwestern United States. Lefty Wilson toured with Gilkerson's Union Giants in 1926, a white team in Bertha, Minnesota in 1927 and 1928, and he was rumored to have played in Sioux City, Iowa in 1929 and Little Falls, Minnesota in 1930. More unsubstantiated rumors claimed that Brown died in mysterious circumstances in Denver, Colorado in 1930. However, Lefty Wilson shows up again pitching for the Gilkerson's Union Giants again in 1932. Reportedly, he was alive in 1938.

In 1927, a Pittsburgh Courier column solicited opinions for the best black baseball player of all time. On April 2, John Henry Lloyd announced his list which included Dave Brown. When the Pittsburgh Courier announced a similar list in 1952, they included Brown on their second team.

Assuming that the Negro Leagues are considered to be major leagues, Brown has the highest Adjusted ERA+ in major league history (169), and the second highest pitcher's winning percentage after Al Spalding (.738, 62–22).

See also
 List of fugitives from justice who disappeared

Notes

References

 (HTML link)

External links
 and Baseball-Reference Black Baseball stats and Seamheads

1895 births
20th-century African-American sportspeople
20th-century deaths
American expatriate baseball players in Cuba
Baseball players from Texas
Chicago American Giants players
Fugitives wanted by the United States
Leopardos de Santa Clara players
People from Leon County, Texas
Year of death unknown